The 1998 NatWest Trophy was the 18th NatWest Trophy.  It was an English limited overs county cricket tournament which was held between 24 June and 5 September 1998. The tournament was won by Lancashire County Cricket Club who defeated Derbyshire County Cricket Club by 9 wickets in the final at Lord's.  This was the final version of the tournament to be played with 60 overs per side.

Format
The 18 first-class counties, were joined by eleven Minor Counties:  Bedfordshire, Buckinghamshire, Cambridgeshire, Cheshire, Cumberland, Devon, Dorset, Herefordshire, Norfolk, Staffordshire and Wales Minor Counties.  The Ireland national cricket team, Scotland national cricket team and the Netherlands national cricket team also participated.  Teams who won in the first round progressed to the second round. The winners in the second round then progressed to the quarter-final stage.  Winners from the quarter-finals then progressed to the semi-finals from which the winners then went on to the final at Lord's which was held on 5 September 1998. The opening round of fixtures saw Scotland beat Worcestershire.

First round

Second round

Quarter-finals

Semi-finals

Final

References

External links
CricketArchive tournament page 

Friends Provident Trophy seasons
Natwest Trophy, 1998
NatWest Group